The Grand Est Open 88 (previously known as the Open 88 Contrexéville and the Lorraine Open 88) is a tournament for professional female tennis players on outdoor clay courts. The event is classified as a WTA 125 tournament and has been held in Contrexéville, France, since 2007. The tournament was held as an ITF event until 2021.

Past finals

Singles

Doubles

External links
  
 ITF search 

ITF Women's World Tennis Tour
Clay court tennis tournaments
Tennis tournaments in France
Recurring sporting events established in 2007